Los Cocos is a village 105 km northwest of Córdoba, Argentina. It had 1,242 inhabitants in 2010, and a newly constructed secondary school.

References

Populated places in Córdoba Province, Argentina